Seyyedabad (also Romanized as Seyyedābād) is a village in Bahu Kalat Rural District, Dashtiari District, Chabahar County, Sistan and Baluchestan Province, Iran. At the 2006 census, its population was 284, in 68 families.

References 

Populated places in Chabahar County